La Nuit Espagnole (The Spanish Night) is an enamel on canvas painting by French artist Francis Picabia, executed in 1922. It has the dimensions of 162.5 by 131 cm. It is held at the Museum Ludwig, in Cologne.

Description and analysis
The painting is divided in two halves, each one depicts two black and white silhouettes, one male and the other female. The black silhouette of the man is on the left side, while the white silhouette of the woman is at the right side. On the left top of the canvas it reads the title "La Nuit Espagnole", in French. At the bottom left it reads "Sangre Andaluza" (Andalucian blood), in Spanish. The signature of the artist appears at the bottom right. The meaning of the work is complicated by the presence of two colored targets on the female figure, one at her chest and the other at her belly, but also by the strange position of the man, who raises his arms and hands open to her. It can be seen as representing a knife thrower, a banderilla planter or a fandango dancer.

References

1922 paintings
Paintings by Francis Picabia
Collections of the Museum Ludwig